Užgavėnės  is a Lithuanian festival that takes place during the seventh week before Easter (Ash Wednesday). Its name  means "the time before Lent". The celebration corresponds to Roman Catholic holiday traditions in other parts of the world, such as Mardi Gras, Shrove Tuesday, and Carnaval.

Užgavėnės begins on the night before Ash Wednesday, when an effigy of winter (usually named Morė) is burnt. A major element of the holiday, meant to symbolize the defeat of winter in the Northern Hemisphere, is a staged battle between Lašininis ("porky") personifying winter and Kanapinis ("hempen man") personifying spring. Devils, witches, goats, the grim reaper, and other joyful and frightening characters appear in costumes during the celebrations. The participants and masqueraders dance and eat the traditional dish of the holiday - pancakes with a variety of toppings.

See also
 Meteņi
 Maslenitsa

References

External links

 City of Vilnius: Traditional Holidays for City Inhabitants and City Guests
 Danutė Brazytė, 1989. Lietuvių Papročiai ir Tradicijos Išeivijoje (Lithuanian Customs and Traditions.) Translated by Vita Matusaitis. Chicago: Lithuanian World Community, Inc.
 Walking of The Maskers (in Lithuania). Proceedings of an Interdisciplinary Conference on Masks and Mumming, Turku, Finland, August 2002

Festivals in Lithuania
February observances
Carnivals in Europe
Annual events in Lithuania
Winter events in Lithuania